The 1980–81 LSU Tigers basketball team represented Louisiana State University as a member of the Southeastern Conference during the 1980–81 NCAA men's basketball season. The head coach was Dale Brown, and the team played their home games at Pete Maravich Assembly Center.

After a loss to Arkansas in the Great Alaska Shootout, the Tigers won 26 consecutive games before a loss at Kentucky in the regular season finale. As No. 1 seed in the Midwest region, the Tigers avenged the early season loss to Arkansas in the Sweet Sixteen and defeated Wichita State to reach the Final Four. The team finished with a record of 31–5 (17–1 SEC).

Roster

Schedule and results

|-
!colspan=9 style=| Regular season

|-
!colspan=9 style=| SEC Tournament

|-
!colspan=9 style=| NCAA Tournament

Rankings

^Coaches did not release a Week 1 poll.

NBA Draft

References

LSU Tigers basketball seasons
Lsu
NCAA Division I men's basketball tournament Final Four seasons
Lsu
LSU
LSU